Harald Schießl (28 June 1974 – 1 December 2022) was a German jurist. He served on the Federal Fiscal Court from 2015 to 2022.

Schießl died on 1 December 2022, at the age of 48, following a long illness.

References

1974 births
2022 deaths
German jurists